The Eagleville Historic District encompasses a historic mill village in northwestern Holden, Massachusetts.  The area, now part of the village of Jefferson, was developed beginning early in the 19th century, although no industrial structures from that period survive.  The main dam and mill complex that now stand there were built c. 1850, and extended or modified into the early 20th century.  The village also includes significant tracts of surviving mill worker housing.

The district was listed on the National Register of Historic Places in 2010.

See also
National Register of Historic Places listings in Worcester County, Massachusetts

References

National Register of Historic Places in Worcester County, Massachusetts
Holden, Massachusetts
Historic districts on the National Register of Historic Places in Massachusetts